Pellegriniodendron diphyllum is a species of plant in the family Fabaceae. It is found in Cameroon, Côte d'Ivoire, Gabon, and Ghana. It is threatened by habitat loss.

References

diphyllum
Flora of West Tropical Africa
Near threatened plants
Taxonomy articles created by Polbot
Taxobox binomials not recognized by IUCN